The 1954 Baltimore Orioles season saw the restoration of Major League Baseball to Baltimore after a 51-year absence, and the debut of the current edition of the MLB Oriole franchise. Upon the transfer of the moribund St. Louis Browns on September 30, 1953, Baltimore returned to the American League over a half century after the Orioles of 1901–02 departed for New York City, where they eventually became the Yankees. The Baltimore Terrapins of the "outlaw" Federal League filled the void in 1914 and 1915, but the insurgent circuit collapsed without gaining recognition as a "third major league," and, as of 2022, its status remained in dispute. During most of its 51 seasons without a major-league team, Baltimore was represented in Organized Baseball by a top-level minor-league club, the Orioles of the International League.

For the American League franchise itself, its first season in Maryland actually was the 54th in its history: the team was originally founded as the Milwaukee Brewers in 1901, then transferred to Missouri as the Browns, who played from 1902 to 1953. 

Inheriting the playing personnel of the 1953 Browns, the 1954 Orioles finished seventh in the eight-team American League with a record of 54 wins and 100 losses, 57 games behind the AL champion Cleveland Indians. The team was managed by Jimmy Dykes, and played its home games at Baltimore's Memorial Stadium, where it attracted 1,060,910 fans, fifth in the Junior Circuit but a massive 257 percent improvement over the 1953 Browns' totals. The new Orioles' games were broadcast over television and radio by the trio of Ernie Harwell, Howard Williams and Bailey Goss on WMAR-TV/WAAM (television) and WCBM (radio).

Offseason 
 November 30, 1953: Chuck Diering was purchased by the Orioles from the San Francisco Seals.
 February 2, 1954: Satchel Paige was released by the Orioles.
 February 5, 1954: Johnny Groth and Johnny Lipon were traded by the Orioles to the Chicago White Sox for Neil Berry and Sam Mele.
 April 8, 1954: Dave Koslo was acquired from the New York Giants.

Regular season 
April 13, 1954: The Orioles opened their first season as the reborn Browns on the road, on April 13, 1954, at Briggs Stadium against the Detroit Tigers. The Tigers won, 3–0, on three solo home runs (from Ray Boone, Walt Dropo and Frank Bolling).  Steve Gromek hurled the complete game shutout and Don Larsen (who would lose 21 of 24 decisions that year) was the hard-luck loser.
 April 15: Thousands of Baltimoreans jammed city streets as the new Orioles paraded from downtown to their new home at Memorial Stadium.  During the 90-minute parade, the new Birds signed autographs, handed out pictures and threw styrofoam balls to the crowd as the throng marched down 33rd Street West. Inside, more than 46,000 watched the Orioles beat the Chicago White Sox, 3–1, to win their home opener and move into first place in the American League. Clint Courtney hit the first home run in modern Orioles history, a solo blow in the third inning. Ironically, the Orioles lost their last home game of the season, 11–0, to the same White Sox, finishing with 100 losses and 57½ games out of first place.
September 12: At Memorial Stadium, Joe Durham hit a solo home run off Philadelphia Athletics pitcher Al Sima in the sixth inning, to become the first African-American position player to belt a homer in Baltimore Orioles history.
September 14: Paul Richards, manager of the White Sox since 1951, resigns his post to join the Orioles as both field manager and general manager. When Richards' signing was announced, ten games remained in the O's season. Dykes stayed on to finish the 1954 campaign as skipper, and Richards took over in the Baltimore dugout starting in 1955. Richards had compiled a 342–265 (.563) won–lost record as leader of the Pale Hose, turning around the fortunes of the formerly hapless franchise.

Opening day lineup, April 13, 1954

Season standings

Record vs. opponents

Notable transactions 
 May 11, 1954: Neil Berry, Dick Kokos and Jim Post (minors) were traded by the Orioles to the New York Yankees for Jim Brideweser.
 May 12, 1954: Don Lenhardt was acquired from the Orioles by the Boston Red Sox.
 May 25, 1954: Dick Littlefield was traded by the Orioles to the Pittsburgh Pirates for Cal Abrams.
 June 1, 1954: Vic Wertz was traded by the Orioles to the Cleveland Indians for Bob Chakales.
 July 4, 1954: Marlin Stuart was claimed off waivers from the Orioles by the New York Yankees.
 August 7, 1954: Bob Kuzava was claimed off waivers by the Orioles from the New York Yankees.

Roster

Player stats

Batting

Starters by position 
Note: Pos = Position; G = Games played; AB = At bats; H = Hits; Avg. = Batting average; HR = Home runs; RBI = Runs batted in

Other batters 
Note: G = Games played; AB = At bats; H = Hits; Avg. = Batting average; HR = Home runs; RBI = Runs batted in

Pitching

Starting pitchers 
Note: G = Games pitched; IP = Innings pitched; W = Wins; L = Losses; ERA = Earned run average; SO = Strikeouts

Other pitchers 
Note: G = Games pitched; IP = Innings pitched; W = Wins; L = Losses; ERA = Earned run average; SO = Strikeouts

Relief pitchers 
Note: G = Games pitched; W = Wins; L = Losses; SV = Saves; ERA = Earned run average; SO = Strikeouts

Awards and honors 
1954 Major League Baseball All-Star Game
 Bob Turley

Farm system 

Tar Heel League disbanded, June 21, 1954

Notes

References 

1954 Baltimore Orioles team at Baseball-Reference
1954 Baltimore Orioles season at baseball-almanac.com

Baltimore Orioles seasons
Balt
Baltimore Orioles